Farranfore railway station serves the village of Farranfore in County Kerry, Ireland. It is located a short distance away from Kerry Airport.

History
The station opened on 18 July 1859 as part of the Tralee & Killarney Railway which opened on the same date and gave a continuous line from Dublin along the Great Southern and Western Railway (GS&WR) to  then via the Killarney Junction Railway. The GS&WR had heavy interests and investments in both companies and absorbed them both on 1 May 1860.

The line to Valentia diverged from the Mallow/Dublin line to the south of the station, and a bay platform adjacent to the west (down) platform was provided for trains to and from Valentia. In general trains to Valentia originated from Tralee and returned there, and were often timed to pass a Mallow-Tralee train in the opposite direction at Farrenfore. The usual procedure was for the Valentia train to use the bay (thus requiring a reversal either in or out) and for the main line train to use the down platform, even if an up train towards Mallow, thus enabling a cross-platform interchange between the two trains.

The Farranfore–Valentia Harbour line closed on 1 February 1960.

References

Notes

Footnotes

Sources

External links
Irish Rail Farranfore Station Website 

Iarnród Éireann stations in County Kerry
Railway stations in County Kerry
Railway stations opened in 1859
Airport railway stations
Farranfore–Valentia Harbour line